Mohamed Al Rowaihy (Arabic:محمد الرويحي) (born 30 September 1985) is an Emirati footballer. He currently plays as a goalkeeper for Dibba.

Career
Mohamed Al Rowaihy started his career at Dibba and is a product of the Dibba's youth system.

Al-Fujairah
On 15 May 2014 left Dibba and signed with Al-Fujairah. On 30 November 2014, Al Rowaihy made his professional debut for Al-Fujairah against Baniyas in the Pro League.

Dibba Al-Fujairah
On 23 May 2016 left Al-Fujairah and he returned to Dibba. On 17 January 2017, Al Rowaihy made his professional debut for Dibba against Emirates Club in the Pro League, replacing Fahad Al-Dhanhani.

External links

References

1985 births
Living people
Emirati footballers
Dibba FC players
Fujairah FC players
UAE Pro League players
UAE First Division League players
Association football goalkeepers
Place of birth missing (living people)